The 2023 Parramatta Eels season is the 77th in the club's history. Coached by Brad Arthur and co-captained by Clinton Gutherson and Junior Paulo, they will compete in the NRL's 2023 Telstra Premiership.

Background

Squad information
The playing squad and coaching staff of the Parramatta Eels for the 2023 NRL season.

Transfers

In:

Out:

Pre-season

Home and away season

League table

Result by round

Matches

References 

Parramatta Eels seasons
Parramatta Eels season